Bachelor Township is a township in Greenwood County, Kansas, USA.  As of the 2000 census, its population was 230.

Geography

The stream of Chelsea Township runs through this township.

References
 USGS Geographic Names Information System (GNIS)

External links
 US-Counties.com
 City-Data.com

Townships in Greenwood County, Kansas
Townships in Kansas